Bruce Trevor Reihana (born 6 April 1976) is a former rugby union rugby player. He was a utility back, most notably for the majority of his career as captain of Northampton Saints in the English Premership.

Biography 
Born in Thames, New Zealand, Reihana started playing in the National Provincial Championship level with Waikato in 1996 and led them to two Ranfurly Shield victories out of three. He played for the Chiefs in the former Super 12 from 1997 to 2002 with 58 games and 123 points to his name.

Internationally, Reihana represented the New Zealand Sevens in the rugby sevens. He played in the 1998 Commonwealth Games and the 2002 Commonwealth Games, winning gold medals on each occasion. He made 11 appearances for New Zealand Māori. He made his debut for New Zealand against France on 18 November 2000.

After not renewing his contract with the New Zealand Rugby Union in 2002, Reihana managed to get an overseas contact with Premiership side the Northampton Saints. He was used at fullback and became an influential figure for the Saints and even won the 2003–2004 PRA Players' Player of the Year Award.

Reihana was scheduled to return to New Zealand rugby after his stint in Europe, but it did not materialise as he decided to stay in England citing personal reasons. Resuming his career with the Saints, Reihana was promoted to captain after Steve Thompson decided to step down as co-captain.

During a 2006-07 Guinness Premiership match against Gloucester on 23 September 2006, Reihana suffered a knee ligament injury that would sideline him until 2007.

Reihana relinquished the Saints captaincy at the end of the 2008-09 Guinness Premiership, when Dylan Hartley was appointed in his place.

On 2 October 2010 Reihana scored 17 points against the Exeter Chiefs to take him through the milestone of 1,000 points for the Saints.

Bruce left the Northampton Saints at the end of the 2010–11 Aviva Premiership to join the French team, Bordeaux. This was announced over BBC Radio Northampton during the final Aviva Premiership game of the season, against Leeds Carnegie, as Bruce Reihana joined the field.

At the end of the 2013–2014 Season, Reihana retired as a player from professional rugby and became the skills coach for the Bordeaux rugby team. He has since moved to Bristol at the beginning of the 2017/18 season to work with Bristol Rugby.

Bruce Reihana was the Skills and Performance Coach with Bristol Bears and even more so still trained with his players in his fitness programs, he followed this mantra in doing the same with Bordeaux Begles Rugby and is still up with the fitness of The youngest players with in the first XV.

In August 2020, Reihana left his role with Bristol Bears and became skills and attack coach for Clifton Rugby, linking up with former Bristol Captain Matt Salter for the National 2 south frontrunners as they bid to seal promotion to National League 1.

References
.

External links
 
 Saints profile
 Bruce Reihana merchandise
 Bruce Reihana Testimonial 2010/2011 official website
 Purchase Bruce Reihana official prints

1976 births
Living people
Chiefs (rugby union) players
Commonwealth Games gold medallists for New Zealand
Commonwealth Games medallists in rugby sevens
Commonwealth Games rugby sevens players of New Zealand
Expatriate rugby union players in France
Māori All Blacks players
New Zealand expatriate rugby union players
New Zealand expatriate sportspeople in France
New Zealand international rugby sevens players
New Zealand international rugby union players
New Zealand male rugby sevens players
New Zealand rugby union players
Northampton Saints players
Rugby sevens players at the 1998 Commonwealth Games
Rugby sevens players at the 2002 Commonwealth Games
Rugby union fullbacks
Rugby union players from Thames, New Zealand
Rugby union wings
Union Bordeaux Bègles players
Waikato rugby union players
Medallists at the 1998 Commonwealth Games
Medallists at the 2002 Commonwealth Games
People educated at Te Awamutu College